Zikahi Léonce Dodoz (born 28 June 1992) is an Ivorian professional footballer who plays as a forward for I-League club Rajasthan United. He is of Beninese descent.

Club career

Nepal
Claiming he was beguiled by a football agent into entering Nepal, Dodoz plied his trade with Friends Club for a year before moving to Three Star Club for 2013. The Ivorian left the team in December that year without contacting their board, with fans asking to get a replacement for him for 2014.

While lining up for Three Star Club in 2013, Dodoz's mother died. 

He missed the 2014 Nepal Martyr's Memorial A-Division Super Six due to a cracked ankle.

India
Besides Nepal, Dodoz has appeared for various Indian sides in different leagues. In 2015, he signed for Gangtok Himalayan S.C. before moving to Kolkata giants Mohammedan Sporting. With Gangtok, he played in the Sikkim Premier Division League and scored 4 goals in 9 matches.

In Mohammedan Sporting, Dodoz appeared in both Calcutta Football League and I-League 2nd Division matches.

He later signed for Mizoram Premier League side Chanmari FC in 2016. He made his I-League debut as a player of Aizawl FC in 2017 and continued playing for the club until 2019. He scored 11 league goals in 44 official matches.

Dodoz again choose a new club in India, Bhawanipore FC in 2019, that also competes in the Calcutta Football League. He stayed there for a season before moving to Free State Stars F.C. in South Africa. In January 2023, Dodoz moved back to India and joined I-League side Rajasthan United on a season-long deal.

Honours
Three Star Club
Nepal A- Division League: 2013
Manang Marshyangdi
Nepal A- Division League: 2014

Mohammedan Sporting
Calcutta Football League: 2016–17

References

External links 
 Léonce Dodoz at Soccerway
 Léonce Dodoz at Footballdatabase

Living people
1992 births
Ivorian footballers
Ivorian expatriate footballers
Manang Marshyangdi Club players
Three Star Club players
Mohammedan SC (Kolkata) players
Aizawl FC players
Chanmari FC players
Bhawanipore FC players
Free State Stars F.C. players
National First Division players
I-League players
Footballers from Abidjan
Ivorian people of Beninese descent
Association football forwards
Ivorian expatriate sportspeople in India
Ivorian expatriate sportspeople in South Africa
Expatriate footballers in Nepal
Expatriate footballers in India
Expatriate soccer players in South Africa
Calcutta Football League players